Jamie Delgado and Jamie Murray were the defending champions.
Thomas Fabbiano and Matteo Trevisan won in the final 6–2, 7–5, against Daniele Bracciali and Filippo Volandri.

Seeds
First-seeded pair received a bye from the first round.

Draw

Draw

References
 Doubles Draw

Trani Cup - Doubles
Trani Cup